NFI may refer to:

 National Fatherhood Initiative
 National Fisheries Institute, a trade association in the USA
 NFI Group, a manufacturer of buses in Canada
 New Flyer Industries, a subsidiary and predecessor of NFI Group
 Net Foreign Investment, a macroeconomic principle
 Netherlands Forensic Institute (in Dutch: Nederlands Forensisch Instituut)  
 Newfrontiers, a group of charismatic churches that used to be known as NFI (New Frontiers International)
 Netball Federation of India, national body for netball in India.
 National identifier code for Norfolk Island in international sporting competitions
Non-food item, a term used especially in humanitarian contexts for an item other than food.
Non-football injury and illness lists, roster designations used in the National Football League
 Norwegian Film Institute